A suicide bombing on an Egged bus was carried out by Hamas in Jerusalem on June 18, 2002, killing 19 people and wounding over 74. 17 of the dead were residents of Gilo.

The attack 
On the morning of June 18, 2002, at 7:50 a.m., a Palestinian suicide bomber from Bethlehem got onto the Egged line 32A bus, which came from the Gilo neighborhood and stopped at Beit Safafa, an Arab neighborhood of Jerusalem. The bomber boarded the bus and exploded himself in the front. His explosive belt included metal balls for shrapnel in order to maximize casualties.

The perpetrators
Palestinian Islamist group Hamas claimed responsibility for the terrorist attack. The suicide bomber was identified as Muhammad al-Ghoul, a 22-year-old student at An-Najah National University in Nablus. He strapped explosives packed with nails to his body and boarded the bus during the morning rush hour as schoolchildren and commuters travelled to downtown Jerusalem from Gilo. The explosion lifted the bus off the ground, tore off its roof and sent bodies flying through the windows. Two residents of the East Jerusalem suburb of Jabel Mukaber were tried and convicted for transporting the suicide bomber. During a commando raid in Nablus on June 30, Israeli soldiers killed senior Hamas bomb-maker Muhaned Taher, who according to Israel was behind this and other attacks.

Aftermath

Charred bus exhibit
The charred remains of the bus were shipped to America and displayed at the biannual Jewish Expo fair in New York at the initiative of Zaka, an Israeli rescue and body parts recovery organization whose volunteers scrape up fragments of blood and flesh from bomb scenes for burial in keeping with Jewish law. Zaka said its aim was to increase awareness of its work and show the effects of suicide bombings.

See also
Shmuel Hanavi bus bombing
Kiryat Menachem bus bombing
List of massacres committed during the Second Intifada

References

External links 
 Suicide Bomber Hits Jerusalem Bus, Killing At Least 18 - published on The New York Times on June 19, 2002
 Suicide bombing at Patt junction in Jerusalem - 18-Jun-2002 - published at the Israeli Ministry of Foreign Affairs
  Diameter of the Bomb, Documentary about the bombing - published on hulu.com
 Bus Turned to Carnage in Instant - published on Eugene Register-Guard on June 19, 2002

Mass murder in 2002
Terrorist incidents in Jerusalem
Hamas suicide bombings of buses
Terrorist incidents in Israel in 2002
June 2002 events in Asia
Terrorist incidents in Israel
Terrorist incidents in Jerusalem in the 2000s
2002 in Jerusalem
Islamic terrorism in Israel